Memory of a Cut Off Head is the twentieth studio album by American garage rock band OCS, released on November 17, 2017, on Castle Face Records. The album is the first to be released under the OCS moniker since OCS 4: Get Stoved (2005), and is their fifth overall to be released under an abbreviated name.

Produced by founding member John Dwyer, the album is primarily an acoustic collaboration between Dwyer and former core member Brigid Dawson. The album features contributions from current and former members of Oh Sees, including Nick Murray and Patrick Mullins, alongside current members Tim Hellman and Tomas Dolas.

Background and recording
Regarding the use of the name OCS and his return to the project's lo-fi roots, John Dwyer noted: "[Oh Sees and OCS] are two different bands honestly. Two different line-ups. The origin of the OCS came from this band [Orinoka Crash Suite]. We just wanted to get back to writing like that. But I also wanted to write a record with Brigid Dawson. I wanted to do something specifically with her. And it ended up being a lot of fun so I’m glad we did it."

Track listing

Personnel
Musicians
John Dwyer - vocals, guitars, juno sax, electric bagpipes, Mellotron, percussion, The Thing, flute
Brigid Dawson - vocals, keyboards
Tim Hellman - bass guitar
Nick Murray - drums
Tomas Dolas - keyboards
Patrick Mullins - singing saw, home-made electronics, Arp Odyssey
Heather Lockie - string arrangements, viola
Eric Clarke - violin
Emily Elkin - cello
Mikal Cronin - horn arrangements, saxophone

Recording personnel
John Dwyer - producer, recording, mixing
Eric Bauer - string recordings
JJ Golden - mastering

Artwork
Jonny Negron - cover painting
Matt Jones - art layout
John Dwyer - photo of John and Brigid
Adam Beris - Castle Face logo

References

2017 albums
Oh Sees albums